Antonieta Figueroa is a Mexican painter who lives in Mexico City. Born in 1934, she studied at La Esmeralda Escuela Nacional de Pintura, Escultura y Grabado in the late 1950s. She studied under Manuel Rodríguez Lozano and Carlos Orozco Romero.

Career 
Figuero had her first solo show in 1970 at the United Nations in Washington, D.C. In 1973 La Galería Arvil exhibited her work and subsequently represented her for the next decade. The Museo de Arte Moderno displayed Figueroa's work in 1981 in an exhibition entitled Correspondencias and published an exhibition catalogue of the same name. Seven years later in 1988 the Museo de Arte Carrillo Gil ran a solo exhibition entitled Horas de agua. Her work is in the permanent collection of several museums, including the Museo Tamayo.

References 

1934 births
Living people
Mexican women painters
Mexican painters
20th-century Mexican women artists
21st-century Mexican women artists